Edwin Barnard Martin (11 February 1919 – 16 August 1987) was a Canadian member of the British Free Corps, a component of the armed forces of Nazi Germany, during the Second World War. 

Martin was born in February 1919 and hailed from Riverside, Ontario. He was a private in the Canadian Army's The Essex Scottish Regiment, who had been captured during the controversial Dieppe Raid in August 1942. In March 1944, he voluntarily left BFC for the isolation camp, by then situated near Schwerin in Mecklenburg.' The Canadian court-martial which heard his case after the war passed a sentence of 25 years imprisonment for being an informer and a member of the British Free Corps. Martin died in Ontario in August 1987 at the age of 68.

See also
 British Free Corps
 List of members of the British Free Corps

References

Bibliography

External links
 "Forced To Join British Free Corps." Times, London, England, 1 September 1945: 2. The Times Digital Archive. Web. 18 Feb. 2015.
 "Alleged Aid To The Enemy." Times, London, England, 4 September 1945: 2. The Times Digital Archive. Web. 18 Feb. 2015.
 "Denial Of Aiding Enemy." Times, London, England, 5 September 1945: 2. The Times Digital Archive. Web. 19 Feb. 2015.
 "Court-Martial On Soldier." Times, London, England, 6 September 1945: 2. The Times Digital Archive. Web. 16 April 2015.	
 "Germans put Canadian "on the spot"." Times, London, England, 7 September 1945: 2. The Times Digital Archive. Web. 18 Feb. 2015.
 "Sentences For Aiding The Enemy." Times, London, England, 29 September 1945: 2. The Times Digital Archive. Web. 19 Feb. 2015.

1919 births
1987 deaths
Canadian prisoners and detainees
Canadian military personnel from Ontario
Canadian Army personnel of World War II
Canadian collaborators with Nazi Germany
Members of the British Free Corps
Canadian prisoners of war in World War II
People who were court-martialed
Prisoners and detainees of Canada
Essex Scottish Regiment soldiers